Ian Andrew Chesterman  (born 17 April 1959) is an Australian sports administrator serving as the current President of the Australian Olympic Committee (AOC), succeeding John Coates. He previously served as a Vice President of the AOC, and the Chef de Mission of the Australian Team for the 2020 Tokyo Olympic Games.

Chesterman was first elected to the AOC Executive in 2001, and became vice president in 2016.

He was the Chef de Mission (the head of the Australian delegation) at six Olympic Winter Games – 1998 Nagano, 2002 Salt Lake City, 2006 Torino, 2010 Vancouver, 2014 Sochi and 2018 PyeongChang. He was the General Manager at the 1994 Lillehammer Games, being Deputy to Geoff Henke.

Australia has won five gold, five silver and four bronze medals under Chesterman's leadership and come of age as a winter sports nation.

Chesterman was appointed as Chef de Mission for the 2020 Tokyo Olympic Games in 2017, becoming the first Australian to head both a summer and winter Olympic Team, and the first to lead a total of seven Olympic teams. Geoff Henke led six winter teams (1976–1994) and John Coates six summer teams (1988–2008).

Chesterman was Chef de Mission of the Australian Team to the 2016 Olympic Youth Winter Games in Lillehammer.

He was made a Life Member of the Australian Olympic Committee in May 2018.

Currently a resident of Launceston, Tasmania, Chesterman is managing director of Sportcom Pty Ltd, a communications and events company he founded in 1988.

He ran in the election for the Presidency of the AOC in April 2022, against Mark Stockwell. Chesterman won 67-26.

See also 
Australia at the Winter Olympics

Notes

References 
 
 
 
 
 
Australian Olympic Committee Annual Report 2018 (and previous annual reports).

1959 births
Living people
Australian sports executives and administrators
Members of the Order of Australia
Australian International Olympic Committee members
Australian Olympic Committee administrators